The Magic City Morning Star is an on-line newspaper serving the Katahdin region of Maine, including the Penobscot County towns of Millinocket, East Millinocket, and Medway.  As well as local news it aims to cover topics of wider interest.

The newspaper, founded in 2002, and based in Millinocket, utilizes a volunteer staff of citizen reporters and columnists from throughout the political spectrum, as well as syndicated content. The newspaper has never endorsed political candidates.

History
The newspaper began publishing only a few articles per week, in a straight HTML format, its range of coverage limited to the towns of Millinocket, East Millinocket, and Medway, Maine. These early stories, between December 2002 and July 2003, are available for viewing in their original format.

In July 2003, the newspaper converted to a software-based system which allows contributors to post content directly to the site, either published immediately or held while awaiting approval by an editor. Discontinued columns are still available, as is all other content published since July 2003, browsing by category or through its search features.

External links
 Katahdin News

References

Newspapers published in Maine
Citizen journalism
Publications established in 2002
Mass media in Penobscot County, Maine
American news websites
Millinocket, Maine
2002 establishments in Maine